Rabbi Yehuda Gilad (born 30 August 1955) is a former Israeli politician who served as a member of the Knesset for Meimad between 2002 and 2003.

Biography
Born in Brazil, Gilad's family immigrated to Israel when he was eight. He was certified as a rabbi, and headed a yeshiva. In the early 1990s he worked as an emissary for the Jewish Agency and Bnei Akiva in London, and was a programme director for Gesher, an organisation dedicated to bridging the gap between secular and religious youths.

For the 1999 elections he was placed 33rd on the One Israel list (an alliance of Labor, Meimad and Gesher), but missed out on a seat when the alliance won only 26 seats. In 2002 he became chairman of the Meimad secretariat, and on 5 June 2002, he entered the Knesset as a replacement for Maxim Levy. He lost his seat in the 2003 elections.

He is now a Rosh Yeshivah at Yeshivat Maale Gilboa and the rabbi of Kibbutz Lavi. He frequently writes articles on topical issues related to Israel and Judaism.

References

External links
 

1955 births
Israeli educators
Living people
Religious Zionist rosh yeshivas
Members of the 15th Knesset (1999–2003)
Meimad politicians
Israeli Orthodox rabbis
Israeli Jews
One Israel politicians
Brazilian emigrants to Israel
Brazilian Jews
Israeli people of Brazilian-Jewish descent
Jewish Israeli politicians
Rabbinic members of the Knesset
Orthodox rabbis
Yeshivat Har Etzion
Israeli politicians
Religious Zionist Orthodox rabbis